Frank Wattelet (born October 25, 1958 in Paola, Kansas) is a former American football safety in the National Football League for the New Orleans Saints and the Los Angeles Rams. Frank was chosen by the New Orleans Saints as an undrafted free agent in 1981 out of Kansas and played primarily on the Special Teams unit for his first year before becoming a starter in the backfield for the remainder of his tenure with the Black and Gold. He is tied for thirteenth on the all time Saints interception leaders list with 12 picks and scored defensive touchdowns on both an interception return and a fumble return. Frank Wattelet was a starter for 78 of his 91 games with New Orleans Saints and played a total of 98 games before ending his NFL career with the Los Angeles Rams in 1988.

He played college football at the University of Kansas. During his last two years at KU, he became a starter and demonstrated the skills that would land him a chance to play in the NFL.

References

1958 births
Living people
People from Paola, Kansas
Players of American football from Kansas
American football defensive backs
Kansas Jayhawks football players
New Orleans Saints players
Los Angeles Rams players